The British 1,500 metres athletics champions covers four competitions; the current British Athletics Championships which was founded in 2007, the preceding AAA Championships (1880-2006), the Amateur Athletic Club Championships (1866-1879) and finally the UK Athletics Championships which existed from 1977 until 1997 and ran concurrently with the AAA Championships.

The AAA Championships were open to international athletes but were not considered the National Champion in this list if they won the relevant Championship.

Past winners

nc = not contested
+ = UK Championships

References

800 metres
British